Hallas is a surname. Notable people with the surname include:

 Derek Hallas, rugby union and professional rugby league footballer
 Duncan Hallas (1925–2002), politician
 Eldred Hallas (1870–1926), British politician
 Graeme Hallas (born 1971), rugby league footballer

See also
 Hällas, a Swedish rock band
 Halla (disambiguation)